The Solingen trolleybus, also known locally as Stangentaxi, serves the city of Solingen, in the federal state of North Rhine-Westphalia, Germany.

Opened on 19 June 1952, it is the largest of the three remaining trolleybus systems in Germany (the others being in Eberswalde and Esslingen am Neckar). The network centres on Graf-Wilhelm-Platz in Solingen city centre, and one of its lines extends into the neighbouring municipality of Wuppertal. It is operated by Stadtwerke Solingen, the municipal works company.

History
The first trolleybus route was brought into service on 19 June 1952. The network was a conversion of the previous tram network. Conversion from tramway was completed on 2 December 1959. Extensions to the system were opened in 1981–82 – Schlagbaum to Hasselstraße and Höhscheid to Brockenberg respectively – and in 1993 from Aufderhöhe to Mangenberg/Graf-Wilhelm-Platz.

The mid-1990s saw plans to replace the trolleybuses with diesel buses, but this was never pursued; trolleybuses being preferred over diesel vehicles because of superior acceleration and better suitability for the hilly terrain.

In 2009, the last non-articulated trolleybus was withdrawn from service. In November of the same year, route 683 was extended from its trolleybus turntable (which can't be used by articulated buses) in Unterburg to Burger Bahnhof using diesel motors of the then-newest Hess trolleybuses. In August 2014, route 683 was similarly extended on its northern end from Vohwinkel Schwebebahn station to Vohwinkel railway station using diesel motors.

In the late 2010s, the Batterie-Oberleitungs-Bus (BOB) project started to be developed. Using in-motion charging on non-electrified streets, Stadtwerke Solingen plans to convert all of its diesel bus lines to electric operation. The first diesel bus route to be converted this way has been route 695 from Gräfrath Abteiweg to Meigen, which started electric service on 31 October 2019. It uses the existing trolleybus wires between Unionstraße and Bahnhof Mitte, with only short new sections being constructed at junctions of route 695 and at its terminuses.

Network 

, 7 lines are in operation, with weekday frequencies indicated:

Routes 681 and 682 interchange with the city's principal railway station – Solingen Hbf – which lies in the western suburb of Ohligs. The southern extent of 683 is the town of Burg an der Wupper, which contains Schloss Burg (Burg Castle). Burg is also home to the world's only trolleybus turntable, owing to lack of space to provide a full turning circle.

Parts of routes 683 and 695 are non-electrified and are operated using electricity saved from in-motion charging, or diesel motors.

Fleet
 the fleet stands at 49 vehicles: 15 articulated Berkhof buses (2001/2), 20 articulated Van Hool buses (2002/3), and 14 three-axle MAN buses (1986-7).  The latter are due for replacement during 2008.  The power supply is 600 V DC.

See also
Solingen Hauptbahnhof
List of trolleybus systems in Germany

References

External links

 Trolleybus city: Solingen (Germany) at Trolleymotion (German, with automated translation to English and other languages available on-site) 
 

Solingen
Transport in North Rhine-Westphalia
Solingen
Solingen